Crédit Foncier de France (CFF) was a major French bank, active from 1852 to 2019 when its activities were entirely subsumed into Groupe BPCE, although the brand name appears to remain active.

History

The Crédit Foncier (English: landed credit) initially made loans to communes. The movement was initiated by Louis Wolowski and Count Xavier Branicki, and sanctioned by Emperor Napoléon III in 1852 in an attempt to modernize the medieval French banking system and expand French investment outside Europe. Its name became the “Banque Foncière of Paris.” Similar institutions at Nevers and Marseilles were amalgamated into one under the title of “Crédit Foncier de France.” The amount of the loan could not exceed half of the value of the property pledged or hypothecated, and that the repayment of the loan was by an annuity, which included the interest and part of the principal, terminable at a certain date. The Crédit Foncier had a monopoly on mortgages.

In French banking terminology, a "credit foncier loan" typically refers to a loan for a fixed period with regular repayments where each repayment includes components of both principal and interest, such that at the end of the period the principal will have been entirely repaid.  This is to be contrasted with an “interest only” loan where the repayments are of interest only.

On 26 June 2018 it was announced that the organisation was to be closed, and its activities integrated into BPCE. The brand appears to remain active.

Former headquarters

Crédit Foncier moved into the Hôtel Castanier as early as 1854, had it remodeled by architect Antoine-Nicolas Bailly, and expanded into the Hotel d'Evreux in 1896. 

The property was sold by Crédit Foncier to the Thani family of Qatar in 2003 for 250 million euro, and was comprehensively renovated from 2009.

References

 Crédit Foncier website

External links
 
 

Defunct banks of France
Banks established in 1852
French companies established in 1852
BPCE